Bolshesosnovsky District is an administrative district (raion) of Perm Krai, Russia; one of the thirty-three in the krai. Municipally, it is incorporated as Bolshesosnovsky Municipal District. It is located in the southwest of the krai. Its administrative center is the rural locality (a selo) of Bolshaya Sosnova. Population:  The population of Bolshaya Sosnova accounts for 33.5% of the district's total population.

Geography
The main rivers of the district are the Siva with its tributaries the Sosnovka and the Chyornaya. About 32% of the district's territory is covered by forests—one of the lowest rates in the krai.

History
The district was established on March 18, 1924. In 1963, the district was abolished and split between Chastinsky and Ochyorsky Districts. In December 1968, the district was restored.

Economy
The economy of the district is based on agriculture, which accounts for about 81% of the total district's GDP.

Demographics
The most numerous ethnic groups, according to the 2002 Census, include Russians at 92.9%, Udmurts at 2.4%, and Tatars at 1.3%.

See also
Zabolotovo
Zachernaya
Zagibovka

References

Notes

Sources

Districts of Perm Krai